This is a list of programs currently or formerly broadcast by CBS.

Current programming

Note: Titles are listed according to their year of debut on the network in parentheses.

Dramas
NCIS (2003)
NCIS: Los Angeles (2009)
Blue Bloods (2010)
S.W.A.T. (2017)
FBI (2018)
FBI: Most Wanted (2020)
The Equalizer (2021)
NCIS: Hawaiʻi (2021)
FBI: International (2021)
CSI: Vegas (2021)
So Help Me Todd (2022)
East New York (2022)
Fire Country (2022)
True Lies (2023)

Comedies
Young Sheldon (2017)
The Neighborhood (2018)
Bob Hearts Abishola (2019)
Ghosts (2021)

Docuseries
The FBI Declassified (2020)

Reality/non-scripted
Survivor (2000)
Big Brother (2000)
The Amazing Race (2001)
Undercover Boss (2010)
Celebrity Big Brother (2018)
Tough as Nails (2020)
The Greatest #AtHome Videos (2020)
Secret Celebrity Renovation (2021)
Come Dance with Me (2022)
The Challenge: USA (2022)

Awards shows
Grammy Awards (1973)
Tony Awards (1978)
Kennedy Center Honors (1978)
Emmy Awards
CMT Music Awards (2022)

Game shows
The Price Is Right (1972)
Let's Make a Deal (2009)
Lingo (2023)

Talk shows
The Talk (2010)

Late night shows
The Late Late Show with James Corden (2015)
The Late Show with Stephen Colbert (2015)

Specials
Rudolph the Red-Nosed Reindeer (1972)
Frosty the Snowman (1969)
Frosty Returns (1992)
The Story of Santa Claus (1996)
Robbie the Reindeer in Hooves of Fire (2002)

News

CBS Evening News (1948)
Face the Nation (1954)
60 Minutes (1968)
CBS News Sunday Morning (1979)
CBS Morning News (1982)
48 Hours (1988)
CBS Overnight News (2015)
CBS Reports (2017)
CBS Mornings (2021)

Film presentations
CBS Sunday Movie (1989–2006; 2007–15; 2020)

Saturday morning

Lucky Dog (2013)
The Henry Ford Innovation Nation (2014)
Hope In the Wild (2018)
Best Friends Furever (2019)
Mission Unstoppable (2019)

Soap operas
The Young and the Restless (1973)
The Bold and the Beautiful (1987)

Sports

NFL on CBS (1956)
AFC games (and inter-conference games when the AFC team is the road team)
The AFC Championship Game
The Super Bowl (every four years)
The NFL Today (1961)
PGA Tour on CBS (1970)
Masters Tournament (shared with ESPN)
PGA Championship (shared with ESPN)
PGA Tour (shared with NBC Sports)
College Basketball on CBS (1981)
Select weekend regular season games
CBS Sports Classic
Missouri Valley Conference men's basketball tournament championship
Mountain West Conference men's basketball tournament championship
Atlantic 10 men's basketball tournament championship
Big Ten Conference men's basketball tournament semifinals and Championship
College Football (1996)
Southeastern Conference Football, including:
Saturday Game of the Week
The SEC Championship Game
The Sun Bowl
The Army-Navy Game
Formula E (2021–present)
New York City ePrix, as well as 1 additional race
NCAA March Madness (2011)
Selection Sunday (in odd-numbered years)
NCAA Division I men's basketball tournament (shared with Turner Sports)
Final Four and National Championship Game (in odd-numbered years)
UEFA Champions League (2021)
Big3 (2019)

Upcoming programming

Dramas
Tracker (2023–24 season)

Game shows
Superfan (2022–23 season)

Pilots

Dramas
Elsbeth
Matlock

Comedies
JumpStart
 Untitled Damon Wayans and Damon Wayans Jr. comedy

In development

Comedies
A Lot
The Bad News Bears
Book Club
Brutally Honest
Family Insurance
The Honeymooners
The Hilsons
Married With Friends
Mixed Signals
She Gets It From Me
Talk Nerdy to Me
They're With Me
Untitled Earthquake comedy

Dramas
Cambridge
Carver Law
Citizen Jane
Eagle Eye
East/West
For Justice
The Great Game
Guard
Harbor Blue
HSI: Puerto Rico
Manner of Death
Mastermind
The Pact
Peculiar
Samaritan
St. Marks
Watson

Former programming

Dramas

Sitcoms

Specials

Children's animation series

Animated primetime series

Soap operas

Film presentations

News programming

Reality/non-scripted programming

Variety series

Game shows

Saturday morning

Shows

Ace Ventura: Pet Detective (September 16, 1995 – September 6, 1997)
The Adventures of Hyperman (October 14, 1995 – August 10, 1996)
The Adventures of Raggedy Ann and Andy (September 17, 1988 – September 8, 1990)
Aladdin (September 17, 1994 – September 14, 1996)
All Grown Up! (March 13, 2004 – September 11, 2004)
All In with Laila Ali (September 28, 2013—September 26, 2015)
The All-New Popeye Hour (1978–83)
The Alvin Show (1962–65)
The Amazing Chan and the Chan Clan (1972)
Anatole (October 3, 1998 – September 9, 2000)
The Archie Show (1968–69)
Archie's TV Funnies (1971–73)
Ark II (1976–79)
As Told by Ginger (September 14, 2002 – November 23, 2002)
Back to the Future (September 14, 1991 – December 26, 1992)
The Backyardigans (September 18, 2004 – September 9, 2006)
Bailey Kipper's P.O.V (September 21, 1996 – September 6, 1997)
The Batman/Tarzan Adventure Hour (1977–78)
The Beagles (1966–67)
Beakman's World (1993–98)
Beethoven (1994–95)
Benji, Zax & the Alien Prince (1983)
The Berenstain Bears (1985–87)
Bill & Ted's Excellent Adventures (1990)
Birdz (1998)
The Biskitts (1983–84)
Blackstar (1981–82)
Blaster's Universe (September 11, 1999 – September 9, 2000)
Blue's Clues (September 16, 2000 – September 9, 2006)
Bob the Builder (September 22, 2001 – September 7, 2002)
The Brothers García (March 13, 2004 – September 11, 2004)
Bugs Bunny/Road Runner Hour (1968–71; 1975–85)
Busytown Mysteries (September 19, 2009 – September 21, 2013)
Cadillacs and Dinosaurs (1993–94)
Cake (September 16, 2006 – September 12, 2009)
CBS Storybreak (1985–90; 1998)
The California Raisin Show (1989–90)
Captain Midnight (1954–56)
Care Bears: Adventures in Care-a-Lot (September 15, 2007 – September 12, 2009)
ChalkZone (February 1, 2003 – September 11, 2004)
The Charlie Brown and Snoopy Show (1983–86)
Chicken Soup for the Soul's Hidden Heroes (October 3, 2015 – June 24, 2017)
Clue Club (1976–77)
COPS (1988–89)
Conan and the Young Warriors (1994)
Dance Revolution (September 16, 2006 – September 8, 2007)
Danger Rangers (September 17, 2011 – September 15, 2012)
Dastardly and Muttley in Their Flying Machines (1969–71)
Dennis the Menace (1986–88)
Dink, the Little Dinosaur (1989–91)
Dino Squad (November 3, 2007 – September 12, 2009)
The Doodlebops (September 17, 2011 – September 21, 2013)
The Doodlebops' Rockin Road Show (April 3, 2010 – September 3, 2011)
Dora the Explorer (September 16, 2000 – September 9, 2006)
Drak Pack (1980)
The Dukes (1983)
Dumb Bunnies (1998–99)
Dungeons & Dragons (1983–87)
Far Out Space Nuts (1975–76)
Fat Albert and the Cosby Kids (1972–84)
Fievel's American Tails (September 19, 1992 – September 4, 1993)
The Flintstone Comedy Hour (1972–73)
Flip! (1988)
Flying Rhino Junior High (1998–2000)
Frankenstein Jr. and The Impossibles (1966–68)
Franklin (October 3, 1998 – January 30, 1999; September 16, 2000 – September 7, 2002)
Fudge (1997)
Galaxy High (1986–87)
Game Changers with Kevin Frazier (2013–16)
Garfield and Friends (September 17, 1988 – October 7, 1995)
The Get Along Gang (1984–85)
Gilligan's Planet (1982–83)
Go, Diego, Go! (September 17, 2005 – September 9, 2006)
Harlem Globetrotters (1970–71)
The Heckle and Jeckle Cartoon Show (1965–66)
Hello Kitty's Furry Tale Theater (1987–88)
Help!... It's the Hair Bear Bunch! (1971–74)
The Herculoids (1967–68)
Hey Arnold! (September 14, 2002 – September 11, 2004)
Hey Vern, It's Ernest! (1988–89)
Hong Kong Phooey (1975–1980)
Horseland (September 16, 2006 – September 12, 2009; February 5, 2011 – September 15, 2012)
Hulk Hogan's Rock 'n' Wrestling (1985–87)
Inspector Gadget (1985–86; 1991–92)
The Inspectors (2015–19)
Jamie's 15-Minute Meals (2013–14)
Jason of Star Command (1978–81)
Jeannie (1973–75)
The Jetsons (1964–65; 1969–71)
Josie and the Pussycats (1970–71)
Kipper (September 16, 2000 – September 15, 2001)
The Kwicky Koala Show (1981–82)
LazyTown (September 18, 2004 – September 9, 2006)
Liberty's Kids (September 22, 2012 – September 21, 2013)
Little Bear (September 16, 2000 – September 15, 2001)
Little Bill (September 16, 2000 – September 7, 2002, August 2, 2003 – March 6, 2004; September 18, 2004 – September 9, 2006)
The Little Mermaid (September 19, 1992 – September 9, 1995)
Little Muppet Monsters (1985)
The Lone Ranger (1966 TV series) (1966–69)
Long Waith & Short Jackson (1977–83)
Madeline (September 16, 2006 – September 8, 2007)
Marsupilami (September 11, 1993 – September 10, 1994)
The Mask: Animated Series (September 16, 1995 – September 6, 1997)
Meatballs & Spaghetti (1982–83)
The Mighty Mouse Playhouse/Mighty Mouse presents the Mighty Heroes (1955–67)
The New Adventures of Mighty Mouse and Heckle & Jeckle (1979–80)
Miss Spider's Sunny Patch Friends (September 18, 2004 – September 10, 2005)
Moby Dick and Mighty Mightor (1967–69)
The Monkees (1969–72)
Mother Goose and Grimm (1991–92)
Muppet Babies (1984–91)
Mythic Warriors: Guardians of the Legend (October 3, 1998 – September 9, 2000)
The New Adventures of Batman (February 12, 1977 – May 28, 1977)
The New Adventures of Superman (1966–70)
The New Adventures of Zorro (1981)
The New Ghostwriter Mysteries (1997)
The New Scooby-Doo Movies (1972–74)
Noonbory and the Super Seven (August 15, 2009 – September 11, 2010)
Oswald (September 22, 2001 – November 23, 2002)
Pandamonium (1982–83)
Partridge Family 2200 A.D. (1974–75)
The Pebbles and Bamm-Bamm Show (1969–72)
Pee-wee's Playhouse (1986–91)
Pelswick (September 14, 2002 – November 23, 2002)
The Perils of Penelope Pitstop (1969–71)
Pole Position (1984)
Popeye and Son (1987–88)
Project G.e.e.K.e.R. (1996)
Pryor's Place (1984–85)
Raggedy Ann and Andy (1988–90)
Raw Toonage (1992–93)
Really Wild Animals (September 16, 1995 – September 14, 1996)
Recipe Rehab (September 28, 2013 – September 26, 2015)
Rescue Heroes (September 11, 1999 – September 9, 2000)
Richie Rich (1986)
Riders in the Sky (1990–92)
Rugrats (February 1, 2003 – August 2, 2003)
Rupert (1999)
Sabrina: The Animated Series (September 15, 2006 – October 27, 2007; September 19, 2009 – January 29, 2011)
Sabrina the Teenage Witch (1970–74)
Sabrina's Secret Life (September 18, 2010 – January 29, 2011)
Santo Bugito (September 16, 1995 – September 14, 1996)
Saturday Supercade (1983–86)
Scooby-Doo, Where Are You! (1969–70; 1974–76)
The Secrets of Isis (1975–77)
Secrets of the Cryptkeeper's Haunted House (1996–97)
Shazam! (1974–77)
Shazam!/Isis Hour (1975–77)
Shazzan (1967–69)
Shirt Tales (1984–85)
The Skatebirds (1977–78)
Space Academy (1977–79)
Space Ghost (1966–68)
The Sports Illustrated for Kids Show (1997)
Strawberry Shortcake (September 15, 2007 – September 12, 2009; April 3, 2010 – September 11, 2010)
Super Mario New Adventures (1995–97) (moved to NBC)
Super Splat Ball: Adventures in Splatterland (1995–97)
Superman (1988–89)
Sushi Pack (November 3, 2007 – September 12, 2009)
Sylvester & Tweety (1976–77)
Sylvester & Tweety, Daffy & Speedy (1981–82)
Tails of Valor (2019)
Tales from the Cryptkeeper (October 3-31, 1998; September 11, 1999 – September 9, 2000)
The Tarzan/Lone Ranger Adventure Hour (1980–82)
Tarzan, Lord of the Jungle (1976–84)
Tarzan and the Super 7 (1978–80)
Teen Wolf (1986–87)
Teenage Mutant Ninja Turtles (1990–96; originated in syndication in 1987, moved to CBS in 1990 during its fourth season)
Tennessee Tuxedo and His Tales (1963–66)
Timon & Pumbaa (September 16, 1995 – September 6, 1997)
Tom and Jerry (1965–67, 1997–2013)
The Tom and Jerry Comedy Show (1980–82)
Trollkins (1981–82)
Trollz (September 16, 2006 – October 27, 2007; February 5, 2011 – September 15, 2011)
The Twisted Tales of Felix the Cat (September 16, 1995 – September 6, 1997)
Underdog (1966–67)
The U.S. of Archie (1974–76)
Valley of the Dinosaurs (1974–76)
Wacky Races (1968–70)
The Weird Al Show (1997–98)
Wheel 2000 (September 13, 1997 – September 26, 1998)
Where's Wally? (1991–92)
The Wild Thornberrys (September 14, 2002 – March 6, 2004)
Wildfire (1986)
The Wuzzles (1985)

Interstitials
Amby & Dexter
I Can Do It!
Just Ask!
Just for Me Stories
LazyTown Shorts
Maggie and the Ferocious Beast
Mighty Bug 5
Miss Spider's Bug Facts
Nick Jr. Playful Parent
Nick Jr. Presents
Nick Jr. Show and Tell
Nick Jr. Sings
Nickelodeon Election Connection
Stickin' Around
Tinpo
What's the Buzz with Philomena Fly

Other
Lamp Unto My Feet (1948–79) – religious program
You Are There (1953–57; 1971–72) – historical educational docu-drama
Captain Kangaroo (October 3, 1955 – December 8, 1984) – weekday morning children's program
The Wizard of Oz (1956, 1959–67; 1976–98) – annual TV event
'Way Out (1961)
Walt Disney (1981–1983)
The Country Music Association Awards (1972–2005)
Circus of the Stars (1977–94)
The Magic of David Copperfield (1978–2001)
Miss USA/Miss Universe (1960–2002);  Miss Teen-USA (1983–2002)
World of Discovery (1985–97) – documentary series
Special Report: Journey To Mars (1996) – documentary film
Academy of Country Music Awards (1998–2021)
Victoria's Secret Fashion Show (2002–03; 2005–17)
Harper's Globe (2009)

References

 
CBS
Paramount Global-related lists